Gauchin-Légal (or  Gauchin-le-Gal) is a commune in the Pas-de-Calais department in the Hauts-de-France region of France.

Geography 
A small stream, the ‘ruisseau Caucourt’, a tributary of the river Lawe, flows through the village.

Population

Places of interest 
 "Le Gal", a sandstone rock chained to another on the village square.
 The church of St. Joseph, dating from the sixteenth century.
 The eighteenth-century château.

See also 
Communes of the Pas-de-Calais department

References 

Gauchinlegal